William Faversham (12 February 1868 – 7 April 1940) was an English stage and film actor, manager, and producer.

Biography
He was born in London. As a teen in the mid 1880s he saw actor Maurice Barrymore on tour and followed the actor through the streets of London during the Barrymore family's stay there from 1884-86. Young Faversham was so impressed by Barrymore and other actors he sought to become one himself. One of the highest paid actors at the turn of the century earning upward of $5,000,000 annually he became one of the last of the legendary actor-managers, William Faversham became a major name on Broadway in the original production of The Importance of Being Earnest in 1895. Faversham was much admired in such potboilers as Brother Officers (1900), which he revived twice that same year and the next, and he produced, directed, and starred in the original production of The Squaw Man (1906). Productions of both Julius Caesar (1914) and Othello (1917) followed. Faversham's Broadway swan song came in a 1931 repertory presentation of Julius Caesar, Hamlet, and The Merchant of Venice.

He became a motion picture star in 1915 courtesy of the burgeoning Metro Pictures. At one point, Faversham's popularity at Metro was second only to that of Francis X. Bushman, the leading matinee idol of the era. Quite elderly by then, Faversham later appeared in bit roles in talkies, including portraying the Duke of Wellington in the Technicolor production of Becky Sharp and, of all things, playing the heroine's father in the low-budget singing cowboy oater The Singing Buckaroo (1937).
 
He was married to stage actresses Edith Campbell and Julie Opp and was the father of William Faversham and actor Philip Faversham.

He received a star on the Hollywood Walk of Fame in 1940, the year of his death in Bay Shore, Long Island, New York. He and his wife Julie Opp Faversham are both interred at Huntington Rural Cemetery in Huntington, Long Island, New York.

Filmography

References

External links

Julie Opp(William's beloved wife died 1921); PeriodPaper.com, circa 1910 (Wayback Machine)
Julie Opp, William Faversham and their sons Phillip and William Jr., 1917 National Red Cross Pageant

1868 births
1940 deaths
English male film actors
English male silent film actors
English male stage actors
American male stage actors
Male actors from London
20th-century English male actors
English emigrants to the United States